"Line of Fire" is a song performed by E-Type and The Poodles at Melodifestivalen 2008, participating in the first semifinal in Gothenburg. Ending up third, the song went further to  Andra chansen ni Kiruna on 8 March 2008, participating against Sibel Redzep's That is Where I'll Go, ending up knocked out.

Single
The single was released on 12 March 2008, peaking at third position at the Swedish singles chart. The song also ended up as the 94th most successful Trackslistan song of 2008.

Track listing
Line of Fire (radio edit)
Line of Fire (singback version)

Charts

Weekly charts

Year-end charts

References

External links
Information at Svensk mediedatabas
Lyrics of this song - Line of Fire

2008 songs
2008 singles
English-language Swedish songs
Melodifestivalen songs of 2008
Eurodance songs